Uvijek vjerni is a supporters group in Croatia who follow the Croatia national football team.

References

Association football supporters' associations
Croatian football supporters' associations
Croatia national football team